Jill Harris is an American voice actress. She has been voice acting professionally since 2015 and received her first lead role with Naho Takamiya in Orange. Some of her other lead roles include Aura Bella Flora in Overlord, Fuuka Akitsuki in Fuuka, Charlie Morningstar in Hazbin Hotel, and Noelle Silva in Black Clover.

Filmography

Anime

Films

Video games

Animation

References

External links

Living people
Actresses from Tennessee
American stage actresses
American video game actresses
American voice actresses
People from Clarksville, Tennessee
Year of birth missing (living people)
21st-century American actresses